The IBM 2321 Data Cell announced in April 1964 (withdrawn January 1975) is a discontinued direct access storage device (DASD) for the IBM System/360.  It holds up to 400 megabytes of data, with an access time of 95 milliseconds to 600 milliseconds, depending on the addressed strip position and data arrangement in each data cell.

The 2321 was whimsically known as the "noodle picker" since the removable magnetic strips were flexible and resembled lasagna noodles.

Characteristics 
The 2321 houses up to ten removable and interchangeable data cells, each containing 40 megabytes. Each data cell contains 200 strips of magnetic tape, which are the basic recording media. The total storage capacity is 400 megabytes or 800 million decimal digits. Up to eight 2321s can be attached to the IBM 2841 Control Unit, allowing an overall capacity of over three GB.

In comparison to the contemporary IBM 2311 Disk Device, the IBM 2321 Data Cell Device holds 55 times more data, while being only seven times slower (85ms and 600ms access times respectively). One fully loaded IBM 2841 Control Unit connected with eight IBM 2321 Data Cell Devices has the capacity of 441 IBM 2311 Disk Devices, which would need to be connected to 56 IBM 2841 Control Units, which would require seven data channels.

The Data Cell makes use of three concurrently operating separate seeking systems: a servo-hydraulic one to rotate the bins to select the proper subcell, and two solenoid driven ones: one to select the correct strip tab of the ten in the subcell, and the other to select one of the five head positions, for the 20 element head (100 tracks per strip). The hydraulic fluid, Mobil DTE Light, a machine tool circulating oil, is pressurized at 1500 psi and despite a lot of folklore about oil leaks, they were very rare. The oil sump holds .

Although its storage medium is tape, the 2321 is classified as a direct access storage device which can directly access a record rather than scan all the tape to find a record as would a conventional tape drive. IBM's System/360 channels addressed the 2321 as a direct access storage devices, i.e., a disk drive, with a 6-byte seek address of the form ØBBSCH (hexadecimal) where the first byte is zero and the remaining bytes address the Bin (i.e., cell), Bin (i.e., sub-cell), Strip, Cylinder and Head.

References

External links 
 The IBM 2321 Data Cell Drive at Columbia University
 
 The IBM 2321 Data Cell Drive for portions of IBM manual.
 Close up photo of Data Cell drive
 IBM System/360 Component Descriptions - IBM 2841 and Associated DASD pages 65 to 72 describe the IBM 2321

2321